

The Leduc 0.21 was a research aircraft built in France in 1953 to refine the practicalities of ramjet propulsion. Initially proposed as the 0.20, it was essentially similar to its predecessor, the Leduc 0.10, but scaled up by around 30%, with tip tanks added to the wings. It was not capable of take-off under its own power, and had to be carried aloft and released.

Two examples were built and completed a very detailed flight test program from 1953 to 1956 to develop automated, operationally viable throttle controls for the ramjet. This included a total of 284 free flights. Designed for subsonic speeds only, the 0.21 reached a top speed of Mach 0.95.

Specifications

References

Bibliography

External links 

 http://xplanes.free.fr/stato/stato-2.html
 test flight footage for Leduc 0.10, 0.16, 0.21, and 0.22 https://www.youtube.com/watch?v=CzUJrweHxso

1950s French experimental aircraft
Leduc aircraft
Ramjet-powered aircraft
Mid-wing aircraft
Aircraft first flown in 1953